Immanuel Presbyterian Church is a historic church at 114 Carlisle Boulevard SE in Albuquerque, New Mexico. The building was designed by architect John Gaw Meem and was built in three phases between 1949 and 1956. It was added to the New Mexico State Register of Cultural Properties in 2004 and the National Register of Historic Places in 2011.

It was listed along with a number of other Meem works, as part of a study of multiple works by the architect.

References

Presbyterian churches in New Mexico
Churches on the National Register of Historic Places in New Mexico
Churches in Albuquerque, New Mexico
National Register of Historic Places in Albuquerque, New Mexico
Churches completed in 1956
New Mexico State Register of Cultural Properties